Saad Shaddad Al-Asmari (born 24 September 1968) is a Saudi Arabian runner who specialized in the 3000 metres steeplechase.

He has won five medals from the Asian Championships, three from the Arab Athletics Championships and a gold medal from the 1997 Asian Cross Country Championships.

International competitions

Personal bests
1500 metres - 3:41.1 min (1994)
3000 metres - 8:12.27 min (2000)
3000 metres steeplechase - 8:08.14 min (2002)

See also
List of World Athletics Championships medalists (men)
List of Asian Games medalists in athletics
Steeplechase at the World Championships in Athletics

References

1968 births
Living people
Saudi Arabian male long-distance runners
Saudi Arabian male steeplechase runners
Saudi Arabian male cross country runners
Asian Games silver medalists for Saudi Arabia
Asian Games medalists in athletics (track and field)
Athletes (track and field) at the 1994 Asian Games
Medalists at the 1994 Asian Games
World Athletics Championships athletes for Saudi Arabia
World Athletics Championships medalists
Asian Athletics Championships winners
Asian Cross Country Championships winners